Alex Dias de Almeida (born May 26, 1972) is a  former Brazilian football player.

Honours 
Winner of Pará State championship in 1993 and 1994 with Clube do Remo
Winner of Goiás State championship in 1997, 1998 and 1999 with Goiás Esporte Clube
Winner of Brazilian championship in 2003 with Cruzeiro Esporte Clube
Winner of Brazilian championship in 2006 with São Paulo Futebol Clube
Winner of Valdir Pereira Trophy (Taça Valdir Pereira) in 2007 with Fluminense for scoring the first goal in the Estádio Olímpico João Havelange
Winner of Brazilian's cup with Fluminense in 2007

References

External links
 CBF 
 sambafoot
 Video of goal by Alex Dias in Brazilian championship 2007
 Guardian Stats Centre
 zerozero.pt 
 gauthinho 
 

1972 births
Living people
Sportspeople from Mato Grosso do Sul
Brazilian footballers
Brazilian expatriate footballers
Expatriate footballers in Portugal
Expatriate footballers in France
Campeonato Brasileiro Série A players
Campeonato Brasileiro Série B players
Campeonato Brasileiro Série C players
Primeira Liga players
Ligue 1 players
Association football forwards
Clube do Remo players
Boavista F.C. players
Goiás Esporte Clube players
AS Saint-Étienne players
Paris Saint-Germain F.C. players
Cruzeiro Esporte Clube players
CR Vasco da Gama players
São Paulo FC players
Fluminense FC players
Brasiliense Futebol Clube players
Clube Recreativo e Atlético Catalano players
Mixto Esporte Clube players
Vila Nova Futebol Clube players
Esporte Clube Pelotas players
America Football Club (RJ) players
Associação Atlética Aparecidense players